Harald Dahlstrøm (born 2 March 1961 in Bergen) is a Norwegian jazz musician (piano and Hammond B3 organ), known for participation on a series of records, from collaborations with musicians like Kenneth Sivertsen and Dance with a Stranger, and as band leader for his own lineups.

Career 
Dahlstrøm had a Harald Dahlstrøm Project performing his own compositions at Nattjazz 1997, and has been engaged at Den Nationale Scene from 1981 to date where he has been a theatre musician for plays like "Les Miserable", "Evig Ung" and "Folk og røvere i Kardemommeby". He has been musical director for the brothers Ylvis on their show "Ylvis – En konsert", and been studio musician for among others Kenneth Sivertsen og Dance with a Stranger.

Dahlstrøm made musical arrangements for the album Strange Afternoon (1991) by the band "Secret Mission" from Bergen. He is also a member / musician and organizer of the in Bergen, hugely popular band "Voksne Herres Orkester" playing to full houses every week at Logen scene in Bergen. In recent years he has participated in the Ole Hamre notion "Fargespill".

Honors 
Vossajazzprisen 1995

Discography

Under his own name 
1989: Gynt, with Jan Kåre Hystad, Knut Skodvin, Thomsen & Tone Ljøkelsøy
1998: Är jag född så vill jag leva! – Syv sanger fra Bellman forestillingen i Logen, Bergen

Collaborative works 
With Jan Kåre Hystad
1999: Design by Sound
2000: Café Hysen Noir

With other projects
1998: One Day in October, with Kenneth Sivertsen
2004: Eine Kleine Kraftmusik, with Fliflet/Hamre
2005: Ocean, with Tron
2008: Good to Go, with Erik Moll

References

External links 
Francesca Strano – HARALD DAHLSTRØM – Kultur Logen 20.8.11 on YouTube

20th-century Norwegian pianists
21st-century Norwegian pianists
20th-century Norwegian organists
21st-century Norwegian organists
Norwegian jazz pianists
Norwegian jazz composers
Male jazz composers
Musicians from Bergen
1961 births
Living people
Norwegian male pianists
20th-century Norwegian male musicians
21st-century Norwegian male musicians